Sphedamnocarpus is a plant genus in the Malpighiaceae, consisting of some 10 to 18 species. They are native to Sub-Saharan Africa and Madagascar, and may be subshrubs, shrubs or climbers. Their mostly yellow flowers have 5 sepals and 5 petals. The 3 to 4-locular ovaries develop into samaras.

Species
The species include:
 Sphedamnocarpus angolensis (A.Juss.) Planch. ex Oliv.
 Sphedamnocarpus barbosae Launert
 Sphedamnocarpus cuspidifolius Arènes
 Sphedamnocarpus decaryi Arènes
 Sphedamnocarpus dubardii R. Vig. & Humbert ex Arènes
 Sphedamnocarpus humbertii Arènes
 Sphedamnocarpus multiflorus Nied.
 Sphedamnocarpus orbicularis Arènes
 Sphedamnocarpus pruriens (A. Juss.) Szyszył.
 Sphedamnocarpus transvalicus Burtt Davy

References

Malpighiaceae
Malpighiaceae genera